Demolished Thoughts is the third solo studio album by American musician Thurston Moore. Mojo placed the album at number 18 on its list of "Top 50 albums of 2011" while Uncut placed the album at number 23.

Background and recording
Demolished Thoughts was produced by Beck and recorded in 2010 in Massachusetts and Los Angeles. The title derives from The Faith's "It’s Time".

Track listing 
All songs written by Thurston Moore.
 "Benediction" - 5:16
 "Illuminine" - 4:02
 "Circulation" - 4:10
 "Blood Never Lies" - 5:07
 "Orchard Street" - 6:56
 "In Silver Rain With a Paper Key" - 5:43
 "Mina Loy" - 4:02
 "Space" - 6:39
 "January" - 4:52
 "This Train Is Bound for Glory" (iTunes Bonus Track)

Personnel 
Thurston Moore - guitar, vocals
Beck Hansen - synths, vocals, bass, producer
Samara Lubelski - violin
Mary Lattimore - harp
Bram Inscore - bass
Joey Waronker - percussion

See also
Mina Loy
Orchard Street (Manhattan)

References

External links
 First Listen at NPR

2011 albums
Thurston Moore albums
Albums produced by Beck
Matador Records albums